Jin Qi (born 26 July 1997) is a Chinese footballer who currently plays for Inner Mongolia Caoshangfei in the China League Two.

Club career
Jin Qi started his professional football career in 2017 when he was promoted to Chinese Super League side Henan Jianye's first team squad. On 21 June 2017, he made his senior debut in a 1–0 away loss to Jiangsu Suning in the 2017 Chinese FA Cup. Jin made his league debut on 5 October 2018 against Beijing Renhe. He was tackled by the opponent when dribbling at the backfield which allowed Cao Yongjing to score the winning goal for Beijing Renhe.

Career statistics
.

References

External links
 

1997 births
Living people
Chinese footballers
People from Zhengzhou
Footballers from Henan
Henan Songshan Longmen F.C. players
Chinese Super League players
Association football defenders